Yolçatı is a village in the Elazığ District of Elazığ Province in Turkey. Its population is 168 (2021). The village is populated by Kurds.

References

Villages in Elazığ District
Kurdish settlements in Elazığ Province